James Aird Nesbitt (March, c.1907 – November 14, 1985) was a Canadian department store owner.

Early life and education 
Born in Westmount, Quebec, he was the first of the two sons of the prominent stockbroker, Arthur J. Nesbitt.

Career 
Known as Aird, when his father purchased Ogilvy's Department Store on Saint Catherine Street in downtown Montreal in 1927, the twenty-year-old Aird Nesbitt took over management of the store. He proved to be a very capable merchandiser whose marketing skills made Ogilvy's one of Montreal's most popular stores. James Aird Nesbitt remained active in the running of the Ogilvy department store until his death in 1985. The executors of his estate sold the Ogilvy store that year.

In 1936, he co-founded the Westmount High Old Boys' Association.

Following the outbreak of World War II, in 1939 he joined the Canadian Army and served overseas. Nesbitt fought in the Italian Campaign and participated in the liberation of The Netherlands. The recipient of a number of service decorations, by the time he was decommissioned after the end of the war, Aird Nesbitt had earned the rank of Brigadier.

Personal life 
In 1935 Aird Nesbitt married Honor Graham Mathewson of Montreal.

An art collector, he owned Thomas Gainsborough's Portrait of Mrs James Unwin completed in 1771. In 1929, he published a biography of Canadian artist, John A. Hammond.

On his passing in 1985 he was interred with other family members in the Mount Royal Cemetery in Montreal.

References 

1900s births
1985 deaths
Canadian military personnel of World War II
Canadian businesspeople in retailing
Canadian art collectors
Canadian people of Scottish descent
Businesspeople from Quebec
People from Westmount, Quebec
Anglophone Quebec people
Burials at Mount Royal Cemetery